Environ was a performance space that was influential during the Loft Jazz scene of the mid-1970s in NYC. It was located on Broadway in SOHO and close to two other noted Loft Jazz venues: RivBea and Ali's Alley. Environ was established by Chris Brubeck and Danny Brubeck sons and band mates of noted jazz musician Dave Brubeck. Environ was managed by John Fischer pianist leader of Interface with assistance by staff Mark Forman indie media producer and Brian Olewnick music blogger and reviewer for Bagatellen.

Environ offered performance space to many Loft Jazz musicians, dancers and other performance artists. Dave Holland (former Miles Davis bassist), Anthony Braxton, Charles Tyler, Hamiet Bluiett, David Murray, Lester Bowie, Joseph Bowie, Chico Freeman were some of the many free jazz artists that performed there. James Siegfried, who was later to become better known as James Chance, and the Contortions (part of the No Wave scene in NYC) had his debut there. Environ attracted many of the future avant-garde jazz and No Wave musicians to its stage and audience. Muhal Richard Abrams one of the founders of the AACM practiced there regularly on the house piano.

Performance art in New York City